Saint-Maur is a commune in the Cher department in the Centre-Val de Loire region of France.

Geography

Population

Sights
 The church of St. Maur, dating from the thirteenth century.
 Two fifteenth-century castles, Mazères and Grande Besse.
 A dolmen, known as the "Pierre des Fées" (fairy stone).

See also
Communes of the Cher department

References

External links

Annuaire Mairie website 

Communes of Cher (department)